A list of films produced in Argentina in 1955:

External links and references
 Argentine films of 1955 at the Internet Movie Database

1955
Argentine
Films